Irving Wolff (6 July 1894, New York City – 5 December 1982, Princeton, New Jersey) was an American physicist and pioneer of radar.

Wolff received in 1916 a bachelor's degree in physics from Dartmouth College and in 1923 a doctorate in physics from Cornell University and then became a Research Fellow there. In 1924 he joined the RCA Technical and Test Laboratory at 7 Van Cortlandt Park South in New York City. In 1930 he was transferred to the RCA Research Department in Camden, New Jersey and became head of the Acoustic Research Department of the merged RCA-Victor Company. From 1924 to 1931 he did research on acoustics. He initiated in 1932 a program of microwave research and in 1934  a program of radar research. In 1946 he was appointed director of RCA's Radio Tube Research Laboratory. In 1951 he was appointed director of research of the RCA Laboratories in Princeton and in 1954 was promoted to vice president of research. He retired from RCA in 1959 and continued to live in Princeton until his death in 1982.

In 1934 Wolff and his team from the research staff from the RCA-Victor Company demonstrated prototype radar equipment to the United States Army Signal Corps at Atlantic Highlands, New Jersey. Using reflected 9-centimeter radio waves, the RCA team located and followed the progress of a ship entering New York Harbor about a half mile (.8 kilometer) away. This experiment may have been the first successful demonstration in the United States of microwave radar.

In 1946 Wolff and colleagues at RCA developed the basis for the Teleran System of Air Navigation for aircraft guidance and air traffic control. In 1949 the U.S. Navy awarded him the highest civilian Navy award — the Distinguished Public Service Award.

Dr. Wolff held over 80 patents and made important contributions not only to microwave radar but also loudspeaker acoustics, infrared detection, and radio frequency heating.

Upon his death he was survived by his widow, a daughter, and two grandchildren.

References

External links

1894 births
1982 deaths
Dartmouth College alumni
Cornell University alumni
20th-century American physicists
Fellows of the American Association for the Advancement of Science
Fellows of the Acoustical Society of America
Radar pioneers
RCA people